Stenodacma richardi is a moth of the family Pterophoridae that is known from South Africa.

References

Oxyptilini
Moths described in 2010
Endemic moths of South Africa